is a Japanese manga series written and illustrated by Yuki Andō. It was serialized in Shueisha's Bessatsu Margaret from 2015 to 2018. The manga received a live-action film adaptation directed by Yuya Ishii and released on June 7, 2019, as Almost a Miracle.

The manga won Andō the New Face Award at the 19th Japan Media Arts Festival Awards in 2015. In 2016, it was nominated for the 9th Manga Taishō and won the New Creator Prize at the 20th Tezuka Osamu Cultural Prize. The manga ranked third place in the 2016 Kono Manga ga Sugoi! guide's list of manga for female readers.

Publication
Machida-kun no Sekai is written and illustrated by Yuki Andō. It was serialized in Shueisha's shōjo manga magazine Bessatsu Margaret from March 13, 2015, to April 13, 2018. Shueisha collected its chapters in seven tankōbon volumes, released from July 24, 2015 to May 25, 2018.

Volume list

References

External links 
 

Manga series
2015 manga
2010s Japanese-language films
Japanese romantic comedy films
Shōjo manga
Shueisha manga
Winner of Tezuka Osamu Cultural Prize (New Artist Prize)